The Australian International Film Festival, or AIFF, was a Melbourne festival held in 2006.

An earlier festival with this name was renamed to Canberra International Film Festival.

Awards 
 Golden Spotlight Award, the Best Feature Film and Best Short Film 
 Silver Spotlight Award, winner in other core categories

October 2006 
In 2006 it was held at Hoyts Melbourne Central on 21–30 October under the direction of Tim. K. Ali and Cameron R. Male.

 Best Feature Film: Self-Medicated (US), directed by Monty Lapica
 Best Australian Film: Puppy (Australia) Kieran Galvin
 Best International Film: Beautiful Dreamer (US), directed by Terri Farley-Teruel
 Best Debut Feature: Johnny Montana (US), directed by John Gavin
 Best Director: Jaume Balagueró for Fragile (Spain)
 Best Actor: Paddy Considine for Stoned (UK), directed by Stephen Woolley
 Best Actress: Diane Venora for Self-Medicated (US) directed by Monty Lapica
 Best Cinematography: Nic Sadler for Intellectual Property (US), directed by Nicholas Peterson
 Best Editing: Rick Ray for 10 Questions for the Dalai Lama (US), directed by Rick Ray
 Best Short Film: Le génie de la boîte de raviolis / The Genie of the Ravioli Box (Switzerland), directed by Claude Barras

References

External links 
 
 2006 List of Award Winners
 

Film festivals in Melbourne
Film festivals established in 2006